

This is a list of the National Register of Historic Places listings in Richland County, South Carolina.

This is intended to be a complete list of the properties and districts on the National Register of Historic Places in Richland County, South Carolina, United States. The locations of National Register properties and districts for which the latitude and longitude coordinates are included below, may be seen on a map.

There are 184 properties and districts listed on the National Register in the county, including 5 National Historic Landmarks. Listings in the city of Columbia, including all of the National Historic Landmarks, are listed separately, while the 38 properties and districts in the remaining parts of the county are listed here. Another property in Richland County outside Columbia was once listed but has been removed.

Current listings

|}

Former listings

|}

See also

List of National Historic Landmarks in South Carolina
National Register of Historic Places listings in South Carolina

References

Richland County

National Register of Historic Places in Congaree National Park